Ben Michael Dempsey (born 25 November 1999) is an English professional footballer who plays for Ayr United.

Career

Charlton Athletic
Having signed his first professional contract with Charlton Athletic in May 2018, Dempsey made his debut for Charlton on 14 August 2018, playing the full 90 minutes in a 3–0 EFL Trophy defeat to Milton Keynes Dons.

Loans
Dempsey joined Kingstonian on loan in December 2019 before joining Dulwich Hamlet on a one-month loan on 8 November 2019, making his debut for Dulwich on that day in a 4–1 FA Cup defeat to Carlisle United. 

He then joined Woking on loan in February 2020 for the rest of the 2019-20 season. On 12 October 2020, Dempsey returned to Woking for a second loan spell, this time running until 9 January 2021. On 13 January 2021, the loan was extended until the end of the 2020-21 season.

On 24 January 2022, Dempsey joined Scottish Championship side Ayr United on loan for the rest of the 2021–22 season, with an option for a permanent deal in the summer.

Ayr United
On 16 May 2022, it was announced that Dempsey would join Ayr United on a permanent deal for an undisclosed fee.

Career statistics

References

English footballers
1999 births
Living people
Association football midfielders
Charlton Athletic F.C. players
Kingstonian F.C. players
Dulwich Hamlet F.C. players
Woking F.C. players
Ayr United F.C. players
Scottish Professional Football League players
Isthmian League players
English Football League players
National League (English football) players